Polívka (feminine Polívková) is a Czech surname, it may refer to:
 Bolek Polívka, Czech entertainer
 Jaroslav Josef Polívka, Czech structural engineer
 Jiří Polívka (canoeist), Czech canoer
 Jiří Polívka (linguist), Czech linguist
 Ondřej Polívka, Czech modern pentathlete
 Osvald Polívka, Czech architect

Czech-language surnames